Konstanty Dombrowicz (born 4 September 1947) is a Polish journalist and politician who was the President of Bydgoszcz (from 2002 to 2010).

Early life and education 
Konstanty Dombrowicz was born on 4 September 1947 in Ludowice, Poland. Ludowice is a village in Wąbrzeźno County, Kuyavian-Pomeranian Voivodeship.

In 1972 he graduated Nicolaus Copernicus University in Toruń and have an M.A degree in Polish philology studies. In 1975 he graduated journalist course, which was organized by Polish Journalists Association (Stowarzyszenie Dziennikarzy Polskich). He was student of administration, e.g. in Federal Academy of Public Administration in Vienna (www), Centre National de la Fonction Publique Territoriale in Paris (www) and European Institute in Łódź (www).

Journalist career 
He worked as journalist for Polish Radio in Koszalin (1972) and in Bydgoszcz (1972-1983). Next he worked for TVP 3 Gdańsk (1984-1990) and collaborated with Bydgoszcz local newspapers.

He was an originator, co-author of regional television TVP 3 Bydgoszcz - he was a first Chief of TVP3 Bydgoszcz (1990-1993). Between 1994 and 1999 he worked in City Office as Chief of Bureau of Executive Committee and as Press Spokesperson. In 1999 he was a Chief of Press Bureau and co-originator of pastoral visits of Pope John Paul II in Bydgoszcz on 7 June.

Between 1999 and 2002 he worded in Voivodeship Office in Bydgoszcz as Deputy of Chief - and next as a Chief - of Information, Promotion and European Integration Department. He was a Voivodeship Governor Press Spokesperson.

Political career

Presidential election of 2002 
In Polish local elections in 2002 he was candidate of Bydgoszcz Civic Agreement Committee (Bydgoskie Porozumienie Obywatelskie) for President (=Mayor) of Bydgoszcz. He was supported by Civic Platform.

On 27 October 2002 he received 15,560 votes (19.01%) and came second in the First Ballot; won being at the Office president Roman Jasiakiewicz (44.82%). On 10 November in Second Ballot Dombrowicz won with 44,263 votes (54.62%).

He took Office on 20 November 2002.

Presidential election of 2006 
In Polish local elections in 2006 he was Independent candidate for President of Bydgoszcz.

On 12 November 2006 he received 34,088 votes (30.69%) and won in the First Ballot. On 26 November, in the Second Ballot, Dombrowicz won with 51,112 votes (53.79%) with Roman Jasiakiewicz (46.21%).

His second term began on 6 December 2006.

Personal life 
Konstanty Dombrowicz is married with Maria Dombrowicz. She is working in Geography Institute in Kazimierz Wielki University in Bydgoszcz. They have two children, a daughter Maria, Jr (born 1974), and a son Konstanty Adam (born 29 May 1978). In 2009 European Parliament election Konstanty Adam was a candidate of Civic Platform from Kuyavian-Pomeranian constituency.

Electoral history

See also 
 List of presidents of Bydgoszcz

External links 
 (en) Official presidential website
 Official presidential photos

1947 births
Living people
Nicolaus Copernicus University in Toruń alumni
Politicians from Bydgoszcz
Polish journalists
Writers from Bydgoszcz
Polish Roman Catholics